William Twala (born 21 February 1990) is a South African footballer who plays as an winger.

Club career
Twala began his professional career with Orlando Pirates FC in 2011, and has since played for Lamontville Golden Arrows, Kaizer Chiefs, Maritzburg United, and Free State Stars, as well as three stints with Chippa United.

He has scored 11 goals and 16 assists in 158 games for Pirates, Chippa United, Golden Arrows, Chiefs, Maritzburg United, Free State Stars, Erbil SC, and most recently Callies in all competitions according to FourFourTwo. While Twala played for Pretoria Callies, he was hoping that the side could gain promotion to the DStv Premiership.

In September 2021, Twala moved to India and signed with newly formed club Madan Maharaj FC, that competes in the I-League 2nd Division.

References

External links

William Twala at flashscore

1990 births
Orlando Pirates F.C. players
South African soccer players
Living people
Association football midfielders
Sportspeople from Soweto
Chippa United F.C. players
F.C. AK players
Erbil SC players
South African expatriate soccer players
Expatriate footballers in Iraq
South African expatriate sportspeople in Iraq